Antonio Bocchetti (born 11 June 1980 in Naples) is an Italian retired footballer who played as defender.

Club career
Bocchetti started his career at Napoli. He played his first Serie A match on 3 December 2000. In July 2003, he was sold to Piacenza then in Serie B in a co-ownership deal; Vittorio Tosto moved to Naples in exchange.

He signed by Parma of Serie A in co-ownership deal in mid-2006, for €400,000. In June 2007 Parma bought Bocchetti outright for another €220,000. In mid-2007, he was sold to Frosinone of Serie B in another co-ownership deal for €450,000. In June 2008 Frosinone acquired Bocchetti outright for another €250,000.

International career
Bocchetti was capped for the Italy U-20 team at the 2000 Toulon Tournament.

After retiring
From 2016 until December 2017, Bocchetti worked as a coordinator for Paganese. From 8 December 2017, he was appointed as sporting director for the club. He worked for the club until the end of the 2017/18, where he joined Fano, also as a sporting director. On 11 March 2019, Bocchetti decided to resign.

References

External links
 
 FIGC profile

1980 births
Living people
Footballers from Naples
Italian footballers
Association football defenders
S.S.C. Napoli players
F.C. Crotone players
Piacenza Calcio 1919 players
Parma Calcio 1913 players
Frosinone Calcio players
U.S. Sassuolo Calcio players
Delfino Pescara 1936 players
U.S. Salernitana 1919 players
Serie A players
Serie B players
Serie C players
Italy youth international footballers
Italy under-21 international footballers